Mohamad Fazrul Azrie Mohdad (born 27 August 1995), also simply known as Mohamad Fazrul Azrie, is a Malaysian male weightlifter and a national record holder for Malaysia in weightlifting.

He claimed his first Commonwealth Games medal at his maiden Commonwealth Games appearance during the 2018 Commonwealth Games after winning the bronze medal in the men's 85kg event. He also dedicated and presented the bronze medal achievement to his mother, who turned 46 years of age when he achieved the bronze medal.

References

External links

1995 births
Living people
Malaysian male weightlifters
Commonwealth Games bronze medallists for Malaysia
Commonwealth Games medallists in weightlifting
People from Johor
Southeast Asian Games silver medalists for Malaysia
Southeast Asian Games medalists in weightlifting
Weightlifters at the 2018 Commonwealth Games
Competitors at the 2017 Southeast Asian Games
20th-century Malaysian people
21st-century Malaysian people
Medallists at the 2018 Commonwealth Games